Fenghuang County, named after the mythological birds Fenghuang, is a county of Hunan Province, China, under the administration of Xiangxi Autonomous Prefecture.

Located on the western margin of the province and the southern Xiangxi, it is immediately adjacent to the eastern edge of Guizhou Province. The county is bordered to the north by Huayuan County and Jishou City, to the east by Luxi County, to the southeast by Mayang County, to the southwest and the west by Bijiang District of Tongren City and Songtao County of Guizhou. The county has 13 towns and four townships under its jurisdiction, the county seat is Tuojiang.

History

Fenghuang County has an exceptionally well-preserved ancient town that harbours unique ethnic languages, customs, arts as well as many distinctive architectural remains of Ming and Qing styles. The town is placed in a mountain setting, incorporating the natural flow of the river Tuojiang into the city layout. Over half of the city's population belong to the Miao or Tujia minorities. It was the centre of the unsuccessful Miao Rebellion of 1854-73, which created a Miao diaspora in Southeast Asia during the last two centuries.  The city is revered in Miao traditions and funeral rites and is the location of the Southern China Great Wall (Miao: "Suav Tuam Choj"), a fortification built by the Ming dynasty to protect the local Han Chinese from Miao attacks.

After 1913, the name of the town changed from Zhen'gan to Fenghuang. 
The ancient town of Fenghuang was added to the UNESCO World Heritage Tentative List on March 28, 2008, in the Cultural category. This ancient town was regarded as the most beautiful town in China by New Zealand writer Rewi Alley. It was built in 1704, and has 300 years of history. The ancient city is a gathering place for Miao and Tujia ethnic minorities.

The town was damaged by flooding in July 2014.

Notable people
Shen Congwen – modern author and researcher of Chinese material arts. His childhood home is a popular tourist attraction in Fenghuang town
Huang Yongyu – painter

Transportation
After arriving at Fenghuang Airport or Jishou Train Station, tourists may take a bus or taxi to Fenghuang County. Zhangjiajie Airport and Huaihua Train Station are also often used as transfer stops for Fenghuang County.

The Fenghuang Maglev opened in 2022, connecting the Fenghuang railway station on Zhangjiajie–Jishou–Huaihua high-speed railway with the Fenghuang Folklore Garden.

Climate

Notes

References
Fenghuang Ancient City - UNESCO World Heritage Centre Accessed 2009-02-25.
Wang, Y., et al. (2007),Brand in China, 五洲传播出版社.

External links

Official website of Fenghuang County government

 
Traditional folk houses in Hunan
Tourist attractions in Hunan
County-level divisions of Hunan
Xiangxi Tujia and Miao Autonomous Prefecture